Yaglou Point is the northern point of Belding Island, Biscoe Islands. Mapped from air photos taken by Falkland Islands and Dependencies Aerial Survey Expedition (FIDASE) (1956–57). Named by United Kingdom Antarctic Place-Names Committee (UK-APC) for Constantin P. Yaglou, American physiologist who has specialized in the reactions of the human body to cold environments.

Headlands of the Biscoe Islands